Jung Eun-chang (born 17 August 1969) is a South Korean retired para table tennis player. He won seven medals, including two golds, in four Paralympic Games from 2000 to 2012.

He suffered a debilitating back injury during required military service in 1991. He started playing table tennis in 1992.

References

1969 births
Living people
Table tennis players at the 2000 Summer Paralympics
Table tennis players at the 2004 Summer Paralympics
Table tennis players at the 2008 Summer Paralympics
Table tennis players at the 2012 Summer Paralympics
Medalists at the 2012 Summer Paralympics
Medalists at the 2000 Summer Paralympics
Medalists at the 2004 Summer Paralympics
Medalists at the 2008 Summer Paralympics
South Korean male table tennis players
Paralympic bronze medalists for South Korea
Paralympic silver medalists for South Korea
Paralympic gold medalists for South Korea
Paralympic table tennis players of South Korea
Paralympic medalists in table tennis
People with paraplegia
FESPIC Games competitors